Mikulski (feminine Mikulska) is a Polish surname. Notable people include:

 Albin Mikulski, Polish football manager
 Aleksandra Mikulska, Polish classical pianist
 Barbara Mikulski (born 1936), former United States senator representing Maryland
 Stanisław Mikulski (1929-2014), a Polish theatre, television and cinema actor
 Zbigniew Mikulski, Polish philatelist

Polish-language surnames